The House of the Arrow is a 1940 British mystery film directed by Harold French and starring Kenneth Kent, Diana Churchill and Belle Chrystall. It was made at Elstree Studios. The film is an adaptation of A.E.W. Mason's 1924 novel The House of the Arrow featuring the French detective Inspector Hanaud. It was released in the U.S. by PRC as Castle of Crimes.

Cast
 Kenneth Kent as Inspector Hanaud  
 Diana Churchill as Betty Harlowe  
 Belle Chrystall as Ann Upcott  
 Peter Murray-Hill as Jim Frobisher  
 Clifford Evans as Maurice Thevenet  
 Louise Hampton as Mme. Harlow  
 Catherine Lacey as Francine Rollard  
 Aubrey Dexter as Giradot 
 James Harcourt as Boris Raviart 
 Ivor Barnard as Jean Cladel 
 Athene Seyler

Critical reception
In a contemporary review, Variety lamented, "an uninteresting whodunit geared for the duals," and criticised the film for being too wordy, saying, "it's hard for American audiences to understand much of the dialog because of the accents. Acting is stilted, though Kenneth Kent, as a police inspector, gives a fairly strong performance," the reviewer concluding that "Dreary lighting impedes much of the values"; while more recently, TV Guide also criticised the film's "low production values," and regretted, "Too bad there's no suspense or intrigue in this stock whodunit."

References

Bibliography
Wood, Linda. British Films, 1927–1939. British Film Institute, 1986.

External links
 
Review of film at Variety

1940 films
1940 mystery films
1940s English-language films
British mystery films
Films shot at Associated British Studios
Films directed by Harold French
Films set in England
Films based on British novels
British black-and-white films
1940s British films